Ray Davies (born 1944) is an English rock musician, best known for his work with The Kinks.

Ray or Raymond Davies may also refer to:
Ray Davies (trumpeter), English trumpeter and bandleader
Ray Davies (footballer, born 1931), English footballer for Tranmere Rovers
Ray Davies (footballer, born 1932) (1932–1984), Australian rules footballer for Fitzroy
Ray Davies (footballer, born 1946), Australian rules footballer for North Melbourne
Ray Davies (sailor), New Zealand sailor
Raymond Davies (athlete), English javelin thrower

See also
Raymond Davies Hughes (1923–1999), RAF airman
Raymond Davis (disambiguation)